Edward Hudson may refer to:

 Edward Hudson (dentist) (1743–1821), Irish dentist
 Edward Hudson (fencer) (born 1946), British Olympic fencer
 Edward Hudson (footballer) (1887–1945), English footballer
 Edward Hudson (magazine owner) (1854–1936), founder of Country Life magazine and owner of Lindisfarne Castle
 Edward Hudson (priest) (1791–1851), Irish priest

See also
 Edward Hutson (1871–1936),Anglican Bishop of Antigua and Archbishop of the West Indies
 Edward Hodson (1964), English cricketer